Mama Africa (also known as Mama Africa: The Diary of an African Woman) is the second studio album by Nigerian singer Yemi Alade. It was released on March 25, 2016, by Effyzzie Music Group. The album is the follow-up to her debut studio album King of Queens (2014). It features guest appearances from P-Square, Sarkodie, Sauti Sol, Flavour N'abania, Rotimi Keys, DJ Arafat and Selebobo. The album was produced by GospelOnDeBeatz, DJ Coublon, Selebobo, Philkeyz, BeatsByEmzo, Masterkraft, Rotimi Keys and Mr. Chidoo. It was supported by six singles: "Na Gode", "Do As I Do", "Ferrari", "Kom Kom", "Africa" and "Tumbum". The album's deluxe edition features collaborations with South African musicians Bucie and AKA. Mama Africa won World Beat at the 2017 Independent Music Awards.

Background
Yemi Alade announced that the album would be released in March 2016. She disclosed its title was Mama Africa and said it would focus on the strengths and weaknesses of an African woman. The album combines elements of Afropop, highlife, R&B, coupé-décalé, hip-hop and pop. Yemi Alade said recording the album was a struggle because she was constantly traveling to different countries every day. She also said she recorded the album to "capture all of Africa on one CD". Yemi Alade told The Fader magazine she collaborated with artists from West Africa, East Africa and South Africa. She enlisted GospelOnDeBeatz, DJ Coublon, Selebobo, Philkeyz, BeatsByEmzo, Masterkraft, Rotimi Keys and Mr. Chidoo to produce the album. Mama Africa features guest appearances from P-Square, Sarkodie, Sauti Sol, Flavour N'abania, Rotimi Keys, DJ Arafat and Selebobo.

It was made available for pre-order on iTunes a week before its official release. Yemi Alade announced that proceeds from the sale of the album will go to the Feed a Child charity initiative.  The album's deluxe edition was released on April 6, 2016, and features collaborations with South African musicians Bucie and AKA. Mama Africa charted in Germany, Malaysia and France.

Composition 
The album opens with "Na Gode", an energetic song that adulates God. In "Tumbum", Yemi Alade laments about an undependable lover who likes Nkechi's Jollof but prefers her delicious beans. The house-influenced record "Tonight" features vocals by P-Square. "Kom Kom" borrows from Onyeka Onwenu's "Iyogogo". The Latin-inspired track "Marry Me" is a blend of Nigerian pidgin, Igbo and salsa. The highlife song "Ferrari" has been described as "blatantly materialistic" because of lyrics like "Oga I don tire to stay Mainland/ E no go bad if you buy me mansion for Banana Island/ Open supermarket for me for Netherlands." In "Kelele", Yemi Alade channels King Sunny Adé. In "Ego", she grapples with her need for happiness and the good life. "Nakupenda" contains backup vocals and drumbeat sounds.

Singles
The album's lead single "Na Gode" was released on July 10, 2015. It translates to Thank You in Hausa and preaches the message of gratitude and giving. The song was produced by Yemi Alade's frequent collaborator Selebobo. The music video for "Na Gode" was directed by Paul Gambit and released on November 4, 2015. It features cameo appearances from Skales and Baci. A Swahili version of "Na Gode" was released on January 8, 2016. In an interview on the Homeboyz Radio Morning Show, Yemi Alade said Bien-Aimé of Sauti Sol convinced her to record the song in Swahili.

The DJ Arafat-assisted track "Do As I Do" was released on December 8, 2015, as the album's second single. The song was described as a fusion of Afropop and Coupé-Décalé. "Ferrari" was released as the album's third single on March 9, 2016. It was produced by DJ Coublon and features strings by Nigerian guitarist Fiokee. Yemi Alade debuted the song at the 2016 Africa Magic Viewers Choice Awards. TooXclusive described the song as a highlife song that "talks about love as an action word." The Clarence Peters-directed music video for "Ferrari" was released on March 25, 2016. Nigerian actor Kunle Remi plays Yemi Alade's love interest in the video. Prior to releasing the video, Yemi Alade released a teaser clip of it on March 14.

The Flavour N'abania-assisted track "Kom Kom" was released on May 18, 2016, as the album's fourth single. Its music video was shot and directed by Clarence Peters. The album's fifth single "Africa" was released on July 5, 2016. It features vocals by Kenyan band Sauti Sol and was produced by BeatsByEmzo. The music video for "Africa" was directed by Ovie Etseyatse and contains clips of different streets and iconic towers in African cities, as well as pictures of renowned leaders fighting for independence.

The Selebobo-produced track "Tumbum" was released on November 9, 2016, as the album's sixth single. The music video for the song was directed by Paul Gambit and features appearances from Ime Bishop Umoh and Beverly Osu. In the video, Yemi Alade plays a restaurant cook who serves up tasty jollof and fufu in a rural Nigerian community. In a chat with The Fader magazine in November 2016, Yemi Alade said the video was filmed after several weeks of dance rehearsals. "Tumbum" was featured in Just Dance 2018, an interactive dance rhythm game developed by Ubisoft.

Critical reception 

Mama Africa received mixed reviews from music critics. A writer for Pulse Nigeria awarded the album 3.5 stars out of 5, commending Yemi Alade for improving "significantly from her last solo album with mundane love expressions and stories seemingly turned up a notch." Ade Tayo of Simply Africa Music said with the album's release, Alade "has ample material to use for performance purposes on any platform, across Africa." Adaobi Nezianya of Circulation magazine praised Alade for "curating the right sounds from diverse places to craft an excellent album."

In a less enthusiastic review, Music in Africa's Oris Aigbokhaevbolo said the album has "zero replay value" and further stated that numerous songs on it "carry the specifically vapid materialism of the stereotypical Lagos girl." Wilfred Okiche of 360nobs described the album as "one big dance party" and said its title is "only a ruse to thread her influences and copy catting into a cohesive effort." Okichie also wrote that the album is "as Nigerian pop as they come". Temitope Delano of TooXclusive granted it 2.5 stars out of 5, calling it "boring" and saying it is a "far cry from what was expected from this brilliant artiste."

Accolades

Track listing
Credits adapted from the back cover of Mama Africa.

Personnel
Credits adapted from the album's back cover and AllMusic.

Yemi Alade – primary artist
Koribo Harrison – executive producer
Taiye Aliyu – executive producer
Udoka Oku – producer, featured artist
Rotimi Keys – producer, featured artist
Philkeyz – producer, featured artist
GospelOnDeBeatz – producer
Sunday Nweke – producer
Akwuba Ugochukwu – producer
BeatsByEmzo – producer
Chidozie Ekeh - producer
Kamera - producer
El Emcee - producer
P-Square – featured artist
Flavour N'abania – featured artist
Sauti Sol – featured artist
DJ Arafat – featured artist
Sarkodie – featured artist
AKA  – featured artist
Bucie  – featured artist
Mix Monster – mixing, mastering
Suka Sounds – mixing, mastering
Tee Piano – mixing, mastering
Olaitan Dada – mixing, mastering
Fiokee – strings
Onazi Ogaba (Unravel GFX) – art design
Emmanuel Oyeleke – photography

Release history

References

2015 albums
Yemi Alade albums
Albums produced by Selebobo
Albums produced by GospelOnDeBeatz
Albums produced by Masterkraft (producer)
Albums produced by Mr Chidoo
Albums produced by DJ Coublon
Igbo-language albums
Afro pop music albums
Highlife albums by Nigerian artists
Contemporary R&B albums by Nigerian artists
Coupé-Décalé albums
Hip hop albums by Nigerian artists